Serge Dyot (born 20 January 1960) is a French judoka. He competed in the men's lightweight event at the 1984 Summer Olympics.

References

1960 births
Living people
French male judoka
Olympic judoka of France
Judoka at the 1984 Summer Olympics
Place of birth missing (living people)